Priscus of Epirus (c. 305 – c. 395 AD), also known as Priscus the Thesprotian and Priscus the Molossian, was a Neoplatonist philosopher and theurgist, a colleague of Maximus of Ephesus, and a friend of the emperor Julian.

Priscus was a pupil of Aedesius in Pergamon, and later went to teach in Athens, where he taught Julian. When Julian was in Gaul, he wrote to Priscus in the hope of acquiring the writings of Iamblichus on the Chaldean Oracles. When Julian was proclaimed Caesar he summoned Priscus to Gaul, and he took him with him to Constantinople when he became Augustus in 361. Priscus and Maximus travelled with Julian on campaign in Persia, and they were with him when he died in 363. Sometime after the death of Julian, Priscus was arrested but eventually freed, avoiding the fate of Maximus who was executed in 371. Priscus returned to Athens where he continued to teach for more than thirty years.

References

External links

Eunapius, Lives of the Sophists: Priscus

4th-century philosophers
4th-century Greek people
Neoplatonists
Roman-era Epirotes